Black Is the New Black is the ninth studio album by American alternative rock band Everclear. The album was released on April 24, 2015, by The End Records.

Track listing

Charts

References

2015 albums
Everclear (band) albums
The End Records albums
Albums produced by Art Alexakis